Faisalabad Sadar  is a Tehsil of Faisalabad District, Punjab, Pakistan. The population is 1,465,411 according to the 2017 Census of Pakistan.

References

Faisalabad District
Tehsils of Punjab, Pakistan